The 1983–84 Gamma Ethniki was the first and inaugural season since the official establishment of the third tier of Greek football in 1983. Aiolikos and Almopos Aridea were crowned champions in Southern and Northern groups, respectively, thus winning promotion to Beta Ethniki. Athinaikos and Trikala also won promotion as a runners-up of the groups.

Pannafpliakos, Atromitos Piraeus, Ilisiakos, Achaiki, Panthrakikos, Pontioi Kozani and Toxotis Volos were relegated to Delta Ethniki.

Southern group

League table

Northern group

League table

Relegation play-off

|}

References

Third level Greek football league seasons
3
Greece